Lalganj may refer to:

 Lalganj, Bihar, a town in the Indian state of Bihar
 Lalganj (community development block), Bihar
 Lalganj Raebareli , Uttar Pradesh, a town in the Raebareli district of Indian state of Uttar Pradesh
 Lalganj (Lok Sabha constituency), Uttar Pradesh
Lalganj (Assembly constituency), Uttar Pradesh
 Lalganj, Bihar (Vidhan Sabha constituency), Bihar
 Katghar Lalganj, a town in Azamgarh district of Uttar Pradesh, India